Frederick or Fred Gillett may refer to:
 Frederick H. Gillett (1851–1935), an American politician
 Fred Gillett (astronomer) (1937–2001), an American astronomer